Gómez Manrique (died 19 December 1375) was a Roman Catholic prelate who served as Archbishop of Toledo (1362–1375), Archbishop of Santiago de Compostela (1351–1362), and Bishop of Tui (1348–1351).

Biography
On 18 August 1348, Gómez Manrique was appointed during the papacy of Pope Clement VI as Bishop of Tui. On 8 June 1351, he was appointed during the papacy of Pope Clement VI as Archbishop of Santiago de Compostela. On 2 May 1362, he was appointed during the papacy of Pope Innocent VI as Archbishop of Toledo. He served as Archbishop of Toledo until his death on 19 December 1375. While bishop, he was the principal consecrator of Juan Sierra, Bishop of Orense (1367).

References

External links and additional sources
 (for Chronology of Bishops) 
 (for Chronology of Bishops) 
 (for Chronology of Bishops) 
 (for Chronology of Bishops) 
 (for Chronology of Bishops) 
 (for Chronology of Bishops) 

14th-century Roman Catholic archbishops in Castile
1375 deaths
Bishops appointed by Pope Clement VI
Bishops appointed by Pope Innocent VI